Korobosea is a suburb of Port Moresby, the capital city of Papua New Guinea. It contains the Port Moresby General Hospital and a residential area. Some of the houses in Korobosea date back to the colonial era.

Suburbs of Port Moresby